Georgette Ciselet (Antwerp, born 21 August 1900; died 1983) was a liberal Belgian political woman. Member of the Liberal Party since 1925, she was a lawyer and member of the Council of State (Belgium) (1963-1972); President of the National Federation of Liberal Women (1945-1963); President of the Sixth United Nations Conference on Technical Cooperation (1955); President of the Third United Nations Conference on Social Issues and Refugees (1959).

References

1900 births
1983 deaths
Politicians from Antwerp
Belgian women lawyers
Belgian women in politics
20th-century women lawyers